The 1978 San Diego Chargers season was the team's 19th season, and ninth in the National Football League.

The Chargers improved on their 7–7 record in 1977. This season included the "Holy Roller" game. It was Don Coryell's first season as the team's head coach, replacing Tommy Prothro after four games, and the team's first 16-game schedule.

Said the 2006 edition of Pro Football Prospectus, "The Chargers were one of the worst franchises in the NFL before they hired Don Coryell four games into the 1978 season. The Chargers were 1–3 at the time, but finished 8–4 under Coryell, winning seven of their last eight games for the franchise's first winning record since 1969. Blessed with Hall of Famer Dan Fouts, the creative Coryell always designed potent offenses, but the San Diego Defense didn't catch up until 1979...."

It wasn't all roses for new head coach Coryell as he lost three out of his first four games, before ending the season by winning seven out of the last eight.

Fouts had lost the starting job in Prothro's last game in charge, but grew in confidence as the season progress - 917 of his 2,999 passing yards came in the final three games alone. He had more attempts, completions, yards and touchdowns than in any of his five previous seasons in the NFL, and posted a league-leading 7.9 yards per attempts. Rookie John Jefferson had a sensational year, with 56 catches for 1001 yards. He also scored a league-leading 13 receiving touchdowns, tying a rookie record set in 1952 by Billy Howton.

San Diego brought in Lydell Mitchell to strengthen the running game; in each of the three previous seasons, he had rushed for over 1,000 yards with Baltimore. While less effective in a Charger uniform, he did post 820 yards, while adding 500 more on a team-leading 57 catches. Hank Bauer was used as a short-yardage specialist - 6 of his 9 touchdowns were runs of 1 or 2 yards.

The defense slipped slightly, from 6th to 8th in terms of yardage, but remained a solid unit. Fred Dean had 13.5 sacks, and Mike Fuller ran one of his four interceptions back for a touchdown. Second-year kicker Rolf Benirschke made 18 kicks out of 22; his success rate of 81.8% was the second best in the league.

Early-season resignation of head coach Tommy Prothro and hiring of Don Coryell 

The previous season Prothro had told team owner Gene Klein that he would coach for only one more year.  After the team's third loss in a row, Prothro stayed at the stadium until almost midnight watching game films, and it was during this time that he decided to resign.  In a public statement, he said, "I still believe this is a good football team and it is a playoff contender. However, after disappointing losses to Oakland and Denver and the disaster against Green Bay, I feel a fresh approach and a rude awakening may be what this team needs."  Klein asked Prothro to stay on in an open-ended position to work in such areas as drafting and trading.

The Chargers hired former St. Louis Cardinal Coach Don Coryell who had been asked to step down from an active role by St. Louis at the end of the last season.  Because he still had two years left on his contract with St. Louis, the Chargers agreed to give St. Louis a third round draft pick to fully release Coryell from the Cardinals.  Coryell had previously coached at San Diego State University from 1961 to 1972 before going to St. Louis.  He said, "I'm pleased with the opportunity to coach again in San Diego because it's like a dream come true."

1978 NFL Draft

Roster

Preseason

Regular season

Schedule 

Note: Intra-division opponents are in bold text.

Game summaries

Week 1 

Rookie wide receiver John Jefferson had a successful debut as the Chargers won their opener. Two of Jefferson's three receptions went for touchdowns, and the Chargers led 17-13 after three quarters. A fumbled snap by Seattle quarterback Jim Zorn then gave San Diego a golden chance to increase their lead, but Fouts was picked off in the end zone when he looked for Jefferson once more. Seattle soon reached a 1st and 10 at the Charger 45, whereupon defensive tackle Gary "Big Hands" Johnson made his first career interception, picking off an ill-advised cross-field pass from Zorn and running it back 52 yards for the game's crucial touchdown. By the time Seattle scored again, only 6 seconds remained.

Week 2 

San Diego began on the front foot, seeing a short Benirschke field goal blocked before Pat Curran opened the scoring when he grabbed a deflected Fouts pass in the end zone. Oakland soon tied the scores, but a pair of Hank Bauer runs put the Chargers up 20-7 early in the 4th quarter (Benirschke missed the extra point after the first of these). Ken Stabler had been kept in check up to this point, throwing three interceptions, including two snagged by Glen Edwards on consecutive 3rd quarter attempts. However, he threw his second touchdown of the game with 8:26 to play, then led his team to a 2nd and 10 at the San Diego 14 with 10 seconds to play.

From there, Oakland won the game with the controversial "Holy Roller" touchdown.

Week 3 

A strong 2nd quarter proved insufficient for the Chargers. They trailed 7-0 early in the 2nd, when Dan Fouts hit Charlie Joiner for 42 yards down to the Denver 13. An interception foiled that threat, but Fouts rebounded with consecutive touchdown drives, scoring himself on the first and hitting Jefferson from 20 yards for the second. San Diego led 14-7 at the break, and it was still 14-13 late in the game. However, Rick Upchurch returned a punt 75 yards for the winning score with 3:17 on the clock. Denver then stopped the Chargers on downs and added an insurance touchdown.

Week 4 

Tommy Prothro resigned after a sloppy performance that saw San Diego commit eleven turnovers, one short of the NFL record. The game was scoreless when Lydell Mitchell fumbled on 1st and 10 from the Packer 15. That was the first of a strong of seven consecutive Charger drives which ended in turnovers, including five lost fumbles. James Harris, who got the start over Dan Fouts, threw a pair of interceptions as well as losing the ball once when sacked.

Green Bay led only 7-0 at the break, but the miscues continued in the second half. Punter Jeff West, who had earlier dropped a lost a snap for one of the Charger turnovers, saw a punt blocked and returned for a touchdown. Dan Fouts replaced Harris and lost a fumble, before throwing two interceptions, the latter of which was run back for a touchdown. Finally, 3rd string quarterback Cliff Olander came in and added one more interception to the tally.

San Diego wasted a defensive performance - they conceded only 9 first downs and, thanks to a new club record ten sacks, only 9 net passing yards. Louis Kelcher and Fred Dean each managed 2.5 sacks, while Gary Johnson and DeJurnett had 2.0 each.

Week 5 

Don Coryell's first game in charge ended in defeat after San Diego couldn't hold a second half lead. The pass-oriented "Air Coryell" offense wasn't in evidence yet - San Diego ran the ball 38 times against 23 pass plays, with Hank Bauer gaining a career-high 60 yards. The touchdowns came through the air, though, Dan Fouts finding Pat Curran from 3 yards out, and Jefferson from 21 and 40, Jefferson's first score being set up by a Don Goode interception.

Those success left San Diego up 20-7 early in the 3rd quarter, but they became ragged from there on in, Fouts being picked off to set up a Patriots touchdown, and Benirschke missing a 38 yard field goal. New England later took the lead with an 80 yard touchdown drive, and though Benirschke made amends with a 41 yard kick to put Sand Diego up 23-21, New England then went 73 yards for the game-winning points, which came with 31 seconds to play.

Dan Fouts finished 14 of 18 for 173 yards, 3 touchdowns and an interception.

Week 6 

The first win of the Don Coryell era was one of only two shutouts during his eight-year tenure. Fouts began poorly, with an interception on the game's third play, but bounced back to lead his team 85 yards on their next drive, with Don Woods going in from a yard out for the opening score. A fumble by Denver quarterback Craig Morton set up a touchdown reception by Bauer early in the 2nd quarter, and Benirschke added three field goals as the Chargers coasted home.

Denver had particular trouble passing, with three quarterbacks combining for only 8 completions from 30 attempts. The trio threw one interception each - to Glen Edwards, Louie Kelcher and Mike Fuller.

Week 7 

A trio of Lydell Mitchell touchdowns weren't quite enough for the Chargers to overcome five turnovers. The Chargers had 1st and Goal at the 4 when Fouts was sacked, losing a fumble that A. J. Duhe returned 68 yards to set up the game's opening touchdown; it was 14-0 shortly after another Fouts fumble. The quarterback rebounded with a 22 yard touchdown pass to Mitchell, but the Dolphins restored their 14 point lead after successfully gambling on 4th and goal from the 1 on the final play of the half.

In the 3rd quarter, Mitchell added a pair of 1 yard rushing scores, either side of another Miami touchdown, and San Diego trailed by just seven points entering the final period. However, they could get no further than the Miami 44 on their final three possessions.

Fouts finished 22 of 30 for 313 yards and a touchdown, but threw a pair of 4th quarter interceptions to go with his earlier fumbles. Mitchell had 77 yards rushing and 64 receiving.

Week 8 

A weak performance on rush defense saw the Chargers slip to a one-sided defeat. Detroit used a variety on runners while piling up 273 yards on the ground, from 39 carries. This enabled the Lions to score four touchdowns and a field goal from their first six possessions, all but winning the game in the first half. Fouts threw a 55 yard touchdown pass to Lydell Mitchell, briefly tying the scores at 7-7, but was intercepted three times in the first half. Two of these occurred only seven seconds apart: the Lions tried a field goal immediately after the first interception, but missed, and Fouts threw another as time expired in the half. James Harris came on in relief in the 3rd quarter, and managed a consolation touchdown pass to Joiner.

Joiner gained 110 yards on 5 catches. The previous week, Detroit had run for just 22 yards while getting shut out by Atlanta.

Week 9 

San Diego came from behind the avenge their controversial Week 2 defeat. An 11 yard run by Bauer opened the scoring, but Oakland scored 20 unanswered points on three consecutive 2nd quarter drives, helped by two Fouts interceptions that set them up in good field position. The Chargers responded with an epic touchdown drive to start the second half, going 80 yards in 20 plays, taking 11 minutes off the clock. Lydell Mitchell converted a 4th and 1 on the drive, and Fouts ran it in from a yard out two plays later.

Following an exchange of field goals, the Chargers forced a punt and began on their own 29 with 1:50 to play. Oakland appeared to have stopped San Diego on downs, but a pass interference call against Lester Hayes prolonged the drive. One play later, Fouts hit tight end Greg McCrary by the right pylon for a 29 yard touchdown; it would prove to be McCrary's lone catch of the season. Woodrow Lowe then intercepted Ken Stabler, and the Chargers added a field goal in the final seconds.

Week 10 

Lydell Mitchell led a rushing attack which gained 173 yards on 49 carries, and San Diego won far more easily than the final scoreline suggested. The Chargers twice drove inside the Cincinnati 10 in the first half, but had to settle for a pair of Benirschke field goals. A Bob Klein catch made it 13-0 in the 3rd quarter, whereupon the Bengals, who had posed little threat up until then, reached a 3rd and 7 at the Charger 22.

Mike Williams halted the threat with an end zone interception of Ken Anderson. Anderson's next pass was also intercepted, Mike Fuller snaring his second pick of the game, and running it back 21 yards for a game-breaking touchdown. It was 22-0 before the Bengals added some respectability to the final scoreline, finding the end zone twice in the final 1:27.

Mitchell ran for 101 yards on 28 carries.

Week 11 

The Chargers overcame their own dubious clock management to claim an epic win. Their first touchdown drive featured nine consecutive runs, opening with Lydell Mitchell's 25-yard burst and ending with Hank Bauer driving over from a yard out. Bauer later finished off a drive featuring eleven runs and one pass with another score from the same distance, and the Chargers led 13-3.

Kansas City tied the game with scores either side of halftime, before Fouts went deep for Jefferson, who outran single coverage and hauled in a 46 yard touchdown pass near to the goal line. The Charger defense then foiled Kansas City on a 4th and 1 from the 3, but the Chiefs tied the scores on their next drive, Arnold Morgado running in his second touchdown of the game. Benirschke put San Diego back in front with 1:27 to play, but Jan Stenerud responded in kind with 2 seconds on the clock - his 47-yarder struck the uprights just behind the centre of the crossbar.

Both sides wasted opportunities in overtime. First, Kansas City marched to a 3rd and 1 at the Charger 14; Morgado had converted a 4th down en route, but he proceeded to fumble, and Mike Fuller recovered. San Diego's response was a near mirror-image, Bauer converting on 4th down before Mitchell fumbled, having gained 9 yards on 1st and 10 from the 19. Kansas City recovered, but went 3 and out, giving San Diego a final chance at the Chief 38 with 1:43 to play. Two completions to Jefferson moved the ball to the 15, whereupon Fouts was almost intercepted with 42 seconds on the clock. A running play netted a single yard, after which San Diego let the clock run down to just four seconds before snapping the ball with the offense still on the field. The clock expired as Fouts threw for the end zone, costing the Chargers any opportunity for a field goal, but Jefferson's marker slipped, leaving him open to catch the ball inches above the ground.

Mitchell ran for 144 yards on 29 carries, while Jefferson caught 7 passes for 130 yards and two scores. The winning touchdown, at 75:00, is the latest in any regular season game.

Week 12 

San Diego evened their record with victory at a frigid Metropolitan Stadium. The icy conditions caused numerous errors, with the Charger defense edging the takeaway battle 4-3. After an early Viking touchdown, San Diego responded on their next possession with Bauer's short-range touchdown run. Both sides wasted opportunities in the 2nd quarter. First, Minnesota reached the Charger 13, from where Fran Tarkenton's pass was picked off in the end zone by Pete Shaw. Later, Fouts found Jefferson for a 40 yard gain, and Bauer converted a 4th down to set up 1st and goal from the 2, but he fumbled on the next play, and the ball went through the end zone for a touchback.

The winning score came with 2:30 to play in the 3rd quarter. On 3rd and 9 from the Viking 10, Fouts stumbled on his dropback but got to his feet and fired a pass through heavy traffic to Jefferson in the front of the end zone. Minnesota had five possessions after that, their best chance coming on the final one, when they reached the Charger 30 before Fred Dean pounced on a loose ball to end the threat. Fouts had been forced from the game with an injury, but San Diego ran the final 3:26 off the clock by picking up four first downs with James Harris under centre.

This result left the Chargers two wins back in the wildcard race with four weeks to play.

Week 13 

James Harris had a rough game in relief of Dan Fouts as the Chargers were shut out and all but eliminated from the playoff race. He completed 15 of 41 for 164 yards and a career-high 5 interceptions, including three on consecutive possessions around halftime. Kansas City also turned the ball over three times, but ran for 238 yards and had no trouble putting sufficient points on the board.

San Diego's best scoring chances came in the 3rd quarter - down 20-0, they reached the Chief's 12 yard line before Bo Matthews lost a fumble. The Chiefs fumbled it straight back, but Lydell Mitchell was then stopped a yard short on 4th down.

Week 14 

With Dan Fouts back in the starting line-up, the Chargers cut loose on Monday Night Football. While Chicago fumbled their first kickoff and followed that with a pair of three-and-outs, Fouts set up one touchdown with a 46 yard completion to John Jefferson, and followed that with scoring passes to Charger debutant Larry Burton (16 yards) and Jefferson (42 yards); it was 23-0 less than a minute into the 2nd quarter. In the second half, Bauer broke two tackles at the line of scrimmage, and raced away for a career-long 37 yard touchdown. James Harris came in and threw a pick six for the only Bears points, but redeemed himself by finding Burton for another touchdown.

San Diego outgained the Bears by 481 yards to 112, the smallest amount they'd given up for 17 years. Fouts was 16 of 24 for 269 yards, 2 touchdowns and 2 interceptions, while Jefferson caught 7 passes for 155 yards and a touchdown.

Week 15 

While Miami's win in the early slate of games officially eliminated San Diego from the playoffs, they consoled themselves with another one-sided win. Seattle led 10-6 before Fouts threw a pair of touchdowns to Jefferson in the final two minutes of the first half, sandwiching a Fuller interception. Further scores by Larry Burton (a 55 yard reception) and Bauer (a 1 yard run) followed, as San Diego cruised after the break.

Dan Fouts completed 22 of 33 for 279 yards, 3 touchdowns and 1 interception. On the defensive side of the ball, six sacks were split amongst as many players.

Week 16 

The Chargers signed off for the year by routing the playoff-bound Oilers in their own stadium. Despite turning the ball over three times in the first half, they led 21-17 at the break, courtesy of touchdown receptions by Jefferson and Dwight McDonald (in his final game with the club), plus a short run by Don Woods. A chip-shot field goal by Benirschke and a Bob Klein touchdown catch followed on the first two Charger possessions of the second half, pushing the lead to 14 points.

Houston then stopped San Diego on downs, and halved the deficit early in the 4th quarter. The Chargers quashed any thoughts of a comeback on their next two possessions. First, they went 80 yards on 8 plays, Fouts converting a 3rd and 13 with a 19 yard completion to Jefferson before Woods ran in his last career touchdown from 18 yards out. Then Fuller returned a punt 32 yards to the Oiler 36, and Fouts hit Jefferson for the clinching score a play later.

Fouts completed 21 of 40 attempts, for 369 yards, 4 touchdowns and 2 interceptions. The yardage total was a personal best, and tied Tobin Rote's club record from the 1963 AFL Championship season. Jefferson caught 6 balls for 149 yards and 2 touchdowns. San Diego won their final three games by a combined score of 122-41; the 45 points in this game were their most for seven years.

Standings

References

External links
1978 San  Diego Chargers at Pro Football Reference
1978 San Diego Chargers at jt-sw.com
1978 San Diego Chargers at the Football Database (FootballDB.com)

San Diego Chargers
San Diego Chargers seasons
San Diego Chargers f